Almer is a surname. Notable people with the surname include:

Christian Almer (1826–1898), Swiss mountain guide
Edward Almer, 16th-century Welsh politician
Franz Almer (born 1970), Austrian footballer and manager
Robert Almer (born 1984), Austrian footballer
Tandyn Almer (1942–2013), American musician
William Almer (fl. 1572), Welsh politician